The Enoch calendar is an ancient calendar described in the pseudepigraphal Book of Enoch. It divided the year into four seasons of exactly 13 weeks. Each season consisted of two 30-day months followed by one 31-day month, with the 31st day ending the season, so that Enoch's year consisted of exactly 364 days.

The Enoch calendar was purportedly given to Enoch by the angel Uriel. Four named days, inserted as the 31st day of every third month, were named instead of numbered, which "placed them outside the numbering". The Book of Enoch gives the count of 2,912 days for 8 years, which divides out to exactly 364 days per year. This specifically excludes any periodic intercalations.

Evaluation 
Calendar expert John Pratt wrote that "The Enoch calendar has been criticized as hopelessly primitive because, with only 364 days, it would get out of sync with the seasons so quickly: in only 25 years the seasons would arrive an entire month early.  Such a gross discrepancy, however, merely indicates that the method of intercalation has been omitted." Pratt pointed out that by adding an extra week at the end of every seventh year (or Sabbatical year), and then adding an additional extra week to every fourth Sabbatical year (or every 28 years), the calendar could be as accurate as the Julian calendar.

 

There is some evidence that the group whose writings were found at Qumran used a variation of the Enoch calendar (see Qumran calendar).

See also
Pentecontad calendar

References

Further reading
See the various writings of Julian Morgenstern, James C. VanderKam and others.

 "Sabbatical Years and the Year of Jubilee". Sidney B. Hoenig; The Jewish Quarterly Review, New Series, Vol. 59, No. 3 (Jan., 1969), pp. 222–236.
 "A Possible Method of Intercalation for the Calendar of the Book of Jubilees". E. R. Leach; Vetus Testamentum, Vol. 7, Fasc. 4 (Oct., 1957), pp. 392–397.
 "Jubilee Calendar Rescued from the Flood Narrative". S. Najm & Ph. Guillaume. Retrieved 6/22/2008 from https://web.archive.org/web/20080503173530/http://www.arts.ualberta.ca/JHS/Articles/article_31.htm
 "Sabbatical, Jubilee, and the Temple of Solomon." L. W. Casperson. Vetus Testamentum, Vol. 53, No. 3, 2003, pp. 283–296(14).
 "Calendars of the Dead_sea-Scroll Sect". Edward L. Cohen; CUBO Mathematica Educacional; Vol. 52 No. 2, (1-16). Junio 2003.
 Biblical Calendars. J. van Goudoever. Leiden, E. J. Brill, 1959.
 "Tracing the Origin of the Sabbatical Calendar in the Priestly Narrative (Genesis 1 to Joshua 5)". Philippe Guillaume. Retrieved 6/22/2008 from https://web.archive.org/web/20110605001545/http://www.arts.ualberta.ca/JHS/Articles/article_43.htm.
 "Studies in the Hebrew Calendar: (Interpretation of a Difficult Passage in the Palestinian Talmud)". Solomon Gandz. Proceedings of the American Academy for Jewish Research, Vol. 17, (1947-1948), pp. 9–17.
 "Chronology of the Account of the Flood in P.--A Contribution to the History of the Jewish Calendar. Benjamin Wisner Bacon. Hebraica, Vol. 8, No. 1/2 (Oct., 1891 - Jan., 1892), pp. 79-88.
 "The Calendar of the Book of Jubilees, Its Origin and its Character." Julian Morgenstern. Vetus Testamentum, Vol. 5, Fasc. 1 (Jan., 1955) pp. 34–76.
 "The Judean Calendar during the Second Commonwealth and the Scrolls." Solomon Zeitlin. The Jewish Quarterly Review. New Series, Vol. 57, No. 1 (Jul., 1966), pp. 28–45.

 
Calendars